DZWT (540 AM) Radyo Totoo is a radio station owned and operated by Mountain Province Broadcasting Corporation, the media arm of the Diocese of Baguio. The station's studio is located at the MPBC Broadcast Center, #72 Fr. Carlos St., Bishop's House Compound, Brgy. Kabayanihan, Baguio, and its transmitter is located at Brgy. Beckel, La Trinidad, Benguet. It operates daily from 4:00 AM to 10:30 PM.

References

Radio stations in Baguio
Catholic radio stations
Radio stations established in 1965